Jordan Radio and Television Corporation (JRTV) is the state broadcaster of Jordan. It was formed in 1985 after the merger between Jordan Radio and Jordan Television.

Jordan's first radio broadcasts were received from other countries in the Middle East. Initially known as Transjordan, it did not adopt a radio service of its own until 1948. Radio Jordan first broadcast in 1956. Today it broadcasts a 24-hour Arabic service, as well as an English language service for 21 hours per day and a French language service for 13 hours per day.

The main channel for JRTV is its satellite channel, called Al-Urdunniyya, meaning 'the Jordanian' [channel].

History
Television transmission in Jordan started in black and white in April 1968 from one studio, with three hours of programming. It started as JTV (Jordan Television Corporation).

JTV was admitted as a full active member of the European Broadcasting Union in 1970. The following years witnessed several milestones for JTV. In 1972, it became the first station in the region to operate a second channel, Channel 2, which specialised in foreign programmes, including a news bulletin in English. In 1974, JTV started transmission in full colours using the PAL-B system, and in 1975, transmission was expanded to cover the entire Kingdom. The first face of JTV was Ghada Haddadin, who later acted as the anchor for English news. From 1987, Hala Kharouba served as the host of the English channel. Along with the English programmes on Channel 2, JTV started transmission of French news bulletins and programmes in 1978.

In 1985, Jordan Radio and Jordan Television merged to form Jordan Radio and Television Corporation (JRTV).

Amra Satellite Earth Station was established in 1988 and was linked to the satellites: Eutelsat, Intelsat and Arabsat.

In 1993, the Jordan Satellite Channel was launched and in 1998, a third channel was launched, Channel 3, which was devoted to transmitting the Parliamentary sessions and local and international sports.

In January 2001, the corporation underwent major restructuring. Programmes of Channel 1 and 2 were combined in one main channel. Channel 2 specialised in sports, while Channel 3 was operated in cooperation with the private sector, on the basis of two transmission periods: the morning and afternoon "Cartoon Channel" and the evening "Jordan Movie Channel".

Al-Urdunniyya can be viewed through live streaming online at jrtv.jo

Services
JRTV operates three television channels and four radio stations throughout the country:

Radio stations
Jordanian Radio (Radio al-Urdunniyah) – generalist national radio station
Radio Amman FM – a station with a specific focus on Amman, the capital of Jordan; Irbid has a local version of this station
Radio Jordan – foreign music and programming in English or French, depending on the time of day; broadcasting in English since 1973 (initially on medium wave, then FM since 1994) and in French since 1992
Holy Quran Radio

Television channels
Jordan TV
Sport TV
Al Ordoniyah

List of programmes

Foreign

Drama

 The Adventures of Brisco County, Jr.
   The Adventures of the Black Stallion
 Against the Wind
 Airwolf
 Angels
 Anna Karenina
 Anna of the Five Towns
 Babylon 5
 Battlestar Galactica
 Blacke's Magic
 Blue Heelers
  Bordertown
 Bugs
 Campaign
 Chancer
 The Charmer
 China Beach
 Circus
 The Commish
 The Contract
 Cover Story
 Covington Cross
 Cosby Mysteries
 Crown Court
 Delvecchio
 Dickens of London
 Doctor Who
 Dr. Quinn, Medicine Woman
 The Duchess of Duke Street
 G.P.
 Enemy at the Door
 The Equalizer
 ER
 Forever Green
 Game, Set and Match
 Gone to the Dogs
 The Guilty
 Halifax f.p.
 Hawaii 5-O
  Highlander: The Series
 The History of Tom Jones: a Foundling
 Hooperman
 Hunter
 Inspector Morse
 Jamaica Inn
 Le chevalier de Pardaillan (In French)
 Legend of the Hidden City
 Lois & Clark: The New Adventures of Superman
 L.A. Law
 Madson
 Miami Vice
 Mrs. Columbo
 Murder, She Wrote
 M.A.N.T.I.S.
   The New Avengers
 North of 60
 NYPD Blue
 Remington Steele
 Renegade
 Rich Man, Poor Man
 Roots
 Rue Carnot (In French)
 Sins
 Space Precinct
 Space Rangers
 Star Trek: The Next Generation
  Time Trax
 Turks
 A Very British Coup
 The X-Files
 The Waltons
 Wind at My Back

Children's

 The Adventures of Mickey and Donald
 The Adventures of Shirley Holmes
  The Adventures of Teddy Ruxpin
 The Adventures of the Bush Patrol
 Adventures on Rainbow Pond
 Aladdin
 Animaniacs
  The Animals of Farthing Wood
 Animal Park
  Animated Classic Showcase
 At the Zoo
 Back to the Future
 Bananas in Pyjamas
 Barney & Friends
 Batman: The Animated Series
 Beakman's World
 Beethoven
 Bill Nye, the Science Guy
 Blizzard Island
 Bonkers
 Bosco Adventure (In French)
 Bouli (In French)
  The Boy from Andromeda
 Budgie the Little Helicopter
 Bush School
 Captain Planet and the Planeteers
  Care Bears
 Caroline and Her Friends (In French)
  Cat Tales (In French)
 Chorlton and the Wheelies
 Chris Cross
 Clémentine (In French)
 Cro
 The Curiosity Show
   Deepwater Haven
  Dennis the Menace
  Denver, the Last Dinosaur (In French)
 Dinky Di's
  Dog City
 Dog House
 Double Dragon
 Droopy, Master Detective
 Elly & Jools
 Escape from Jupiter
 The Famous Five
 Fantômette (In French)
  Fievel's American Tails
 Fireman Sam
 The Flintstones
 Freakazoid!
  The Genie From Down Under
 Ghostwriter
 Halfway Across the Galaxy and Turn Left
   Heathcliff (In Arabic)
 Here Comes Mumfie
 The Huggabug Club
   Hurricanes
 The Incredible Hulk and She-Hulk
   Inspector Gadget
 Iris, The Happy Professor
 Jim Henson's Animal Show
 Joshua Jones
 Jonny Quest
 Kelly
 Le Chevalier Du Labyrinthe (In French)
 Le Monde Magique De Chantal Coya (In French)
 The Legends of Treasure Island
 Leo the Lion
 Les Badaboks (In French)
 Lift Off
 The Little Mermaid
  Little Rosey
   Lucky Luke
 Mac and Muttley
  Magic Mountain
  The Magic School Bus
 Madeline
 The Many Dream Journeys of Meme (In French)
 The Marvel Super Heroes
 Masters of the Maze
 The Mask: Animated Series
 Michel Vaillant (In French)
 Micro Kids (In French)
  Mirror, Mirror
 Moby Dick and Mighty Mightor
 Moero! Top Striker (In French)
 Molierissimo (In French)
    Moomin
 Mother Goose and Grimm
 Mr. Bogus
 My Favorite Fairy Tales
 My Life as a Dog
 My Secret Identity
 The New Fred and Barney Show
 New Kids on the Block
 The New Three Stooges
 The Night of the Red Hunter
   Noddy in Toyland
 Noddy's Toyland Adventures
 Ocean Girl
 The Odyssey
 Oggy and the Cockroaches
  Oscar's Orchestra
  Ovide and the Gang
 The Pebbles and Bamm-Bamm Show
 The Pink Panther
 Pirates
 Postman Pat
 Problem Child
 Pugwall's Summer
 Pumpkin Patch
 The Raccoons (In French)
 Rainbow
 Raw Toonage
 Read Alee Deed Alee
  ReBoot
 Richie Rich
 Road to Avonlea
  Rotten Ralph
 Sandokan
 The Scientific Eye
 The Secret World of Alex Mack
 See How They Grow
 Shelley Duvall's Bedtime Stories
 Shingalana the Little Hunter
 The Show with the Mouse
 Sinbad Jr. and his Magic Belt
 Skippy the Bush Kangaroo
 Sky Trackers
  The Smoggies (In French)
  Snorks (In French)
 Spartakus and the Sun Beneath the Sea (In French)
 Spatz
 Spirit Bay
 Speed Racer
  Spellbinder
 Spiff and Hercules (In French)
  Spirou (In English and French)
 Square One Television
 Standby...Lights! Camera! Action!
 Super Champs
 Super Dave: Daredevil for Hire
 Superman: The Animated Series
 TaleSpin
 Teenage Mutant Ninja Turtles (In French)
 Terrytoons
 Time Riders
  Twinkle the Dream Being
 Uchūsen Sagittarius (In French)
 Ultimate Spider-Man
 Vid Kids
 Vision On
 The Wayne Manifesto
 What Would You Do?
 Wild West C.O.W.-Boys of Moo Mesa
 Wish Kid
 Wishbone
 Wonder Why?
 Woody Woodpecker
 The World of Peter Rabbit and Friends
 The Worst Day of My Life
   Wowser (In Arabic)

News
 Envoyé spécial (In French)
 Regarde le Monde (In French)

Talk shows
 Bêtes pas bêtes (In French)

Anthology
 Alfred Hitchcock Presents
 The Twilight Zone

Comedy

 2point4 Children
 The 5 Mrs. Buchanans
 Acropolis Now
 Are You Being Served?
 Big Brother Jake
 The Brittas Empire
 Caroline in the City
 Charles in Charge
 Charlie Chaplin
 Check It Out!
 The Cosby Show
 Dad's Army
 Devenish
 Dinosaurs
 Dudley
 Ellen
 Executive Stress
 Evening Shade
 Ever Decreasing Circles
 Everybody Loves Raymond
 Family Matters
 Fawlty Towers
 The Fresh Prince of Bel-Air
 Friends
 The Golden Girls
 The Good Life
 Grace Under Fire
 Hey Dad..!
 House Calls
 I Dream of Jeannie
 I Married Dora
 Just the Ten of Us
 Keeping Up Appearances
 Laff-a-Bits
 The Many Wives of Patrick
 The Mighty Jungle
 Mork & Mindy
 Mother and Son
 Mr. Belvedere
 The Munsters Today
  The Muppet Show
 Murphy Brown
 The Nanny
 Newlyweds
 No Job for a Lady
 No Place Like Home
 One Foot in the Grave
 Parenthood
 Perfect Strangers
 Robin's Nest
 Saved by the Bell
 The Simpsons
 Sparks
 Step by Step
 Suddenly Susan
 Three Up, Two Down
 Three's Company
 Throb
 Too Close for Comfort
 The Torkelsons
 Who's the Boss?
 Yes, Minister

Soap opera
 The Bold and the Beautiful
 Dallas
 Falcon Crest
 Neighbours
 The Young and the Restless (In Arabic)

Variety
 Champs-Élysées (In French)
 Un DB de plus (In French)

Sports
 The Spectacular World of Guinness Records

Game shows
 The Crystal Maze
 The Desert Forges
 Des chiffres et des lettres (In French)
 Fort Boyard (In French)
 L'École des fans (In French)
 Small Talk
 Treasure Hunt
 You Bet Your Life

Documentary 
 Allo La Terre (In French)
 Ancient Voices
 Big Cat Diary
  Zero Hour
 Enigma
 E=M6 (In French)
 In Search of...
 Life After People
 Life Choices
 Mothers of the Wild
 Shall Never Lose Hope
 Ushuaïa (In French)
 Walking with Dinosaurs

Reality
 The Oprah Winfrey Show

Western
 Dr. Quinn, Medicine Woman
 The Lazarus Man
 Lonesome Dove

Magazine
 The Album Show
 Movies, Games and Videos

See also
Shababnews

References

External links
  

1985 establishments in Jordan
Mass media companies of Jordan
Television in Jordan
Arabic-language television stations
European Broadcasting Union members
Divisions and subsidiaries of the prime ministry (Jordan)
Television channels and stations established in 1985